Yeo Martial (born 2 January 1944) is an Ivorian football manager. He managed the Ivory Coast national team to the 1992 African Cup of Nations, and after a stint managing Africa Sports and the Niger national team, he returned to Ivory Coast set up as Technical Director in 2004.

Martial also runs his own football academy, the École de Football Yéo Martial, in Abidjan, established in 2001, which has an informal partnership with Italian side Parma.

References

1944 births
Living people
Sportspeople from Abidjan
Ivorian football managers
Ivory Coast national football team managers
Niger national football team managers
1988 African Cup of Nations managers
1992 King Fahd Cup managers
1992 African Cup of Nations managers
Ivorian expatriate football managers
Ivorian expatriate sportspeople in Niger